Alexandros Baltatzis-Mavrokorlatis (born 1906, date of death unknown) was a Greek modern pentathlete. He competed at the 1936 Summer Olympics.

References

External links
 

1906 births
Year of death missing
Greek male modern pentathletes
Olympic modern pentathletes of Greece
Modern pentathletes at the 1936 Summer Olympics